Antoetra is a town in Amoron'i Mania Region in central Madagascar 42 kilometers southeast of Ambositra. It is inhabited by the Zafimaniry tribe, a subgroup of the Betsileo tribe.

Many tourists come to the town each day to hike the nearby mountains and visit other Zafimaniry villages and to purchase souvenirs made from wood, which the tribe is well known for doing in Madagascar.

In 2003, the Zafimaniry and their work with wood were considered to be Masterpieces of the Oral and Intangible Heritage of Humanity, a list maintained by UNESCO to protect and preserve their way of life which is being spoiled by tourism.

Antoetra is the capital for the county of Antoetra (Commune Rurale d'Antoetra). An estimated 1,100 people live in the town.

See also
 Madagascar
 Ambositra
 Betsileo
 Amoron'i Mania

External links
 UNESCO Proclamation 2003: "The Woodcrafting Knowledge of the Zafimaniry" Accessed 25 Oct 2009

Populated places in Amoron'i Mania